Vivie-ann Bakos, known as BLOND:ISH, is a Canadian producer.

Origin 
While attending the Winter Music Conference in 2007, Corniere and Bakos started promoting and DJing nights called Blond:ish at the Cherry Nightclub in Montreal. After a while, people started referring to the duo by that name. In 2010, the two moved to London seeking to expand their musical knowledge.

Recording history 
In 2012, they released the Lonely Days EP on Noir Music. After the release of Lonely Days, they were signed by Kompakt label boss Michael Mayer, who released their next EP, Lovers In Limbo, soon after.

They signed to Get Physical Music, where they released their Strange Attractions EP with Thomas Gandey. As a result of their success, they were commissioned to produce remixes for Depeche Mode, Pete Tong, Maya Jane Coles, Kate Simko, and WhoMadeWho.

In a makeshift studio near the Mayan temples in Tulum the band produced their next two Kompakt EPs, Inward Visions and Wunderkammer.

In 2015, Blond:ish marked the release of their first album, Welcome to the Present, released by Kompakt. After having established their rule over the 12" format and turning your run-of-the-mill dance EP into a miniature opera in its own right, Blond:ish were bound to come up with a debut full-length at some point - but even so, Welcome To The Present drops as a major surprise: flexing the psychedelic and spiritual influences that already informed their previous Kompakt releases, this new material presents itself not so much as the collection of DJ-ready peak-time bangers that some would've expected, but as what we admiringly would call a total trip. It sees the duo embark on a universal journey, departing from the club comfort zone and exploring the deeper shades of world electronica from within. Here, each track is part of a bigger story, accomplishing its role in a vibrant, colourful mix of electronic moods, field recordings, traditional instruments and polyglot vocal.

On 16 April 2016, the duo premiered their debut Essential Mix on BBC Radio 1, which they recorded on a makeshift studio in Tulum, Mexico. They have released music on labels like Get Physical, Kompakt, Leftroom, and Noir. The duo has also played at Burning Man.

Performances 
Blond:ish has played festivals and events like Flying Circus, SXMusic Festival, Symbiosis Gathering, the BPM Festival, ENTER., Mysteryland, Ultra Music Festival, and Wisdom of the Glove.

On February 1, 2022, it was announced that BLOND:ISH would perform at the 2022 SXM Festival on the Caribbean island of Saint Martin/Sint Maarten in March of 2022.

Selected discography

Albums

Originals and extended plays

Remixes

Compilations

References 

2008 establishments in Quebec
Canadian musical duos
Canadian DJs
Canadian record producers
Musicians from Montreal
Electronic dance music DJs